Nilo Martins Guimarães (born 4 April 1957) is a Brazilian former professional basketball player and coach.

National team career
With the senior Brazilian national basketball team, Guimarães competed at the 1982 FIBA World Cup, the 1984 Summer Olympics, and the 1986 FIBA World Cup.

References

External links
 

1957 births
Living people
Brazilian basketball coaches
Basketball players at the 1984 Summer Olympics
Brazilian men's basketball players
1982 FIBA World Championship players
Esporte Clube Sírio basketball players
Flamengo basketball players
Olympic basketball players of Brazil
People from Mogi das Cruzes
Point guards
São José Basketball players
1986 FIBA World Championship players
Sportspeople from São Paulo (state)